The 2018 season was Bohemian F.C.'s 128th year in existence as a football club. The club participated in the League of Ireland Premier Division, the FAI Cup, the EA Sports Cup and was also involved in the 2018–19 Scottish Challenge Cup known as the IRN-BRU Cup.

Club

Kits
The club's traditional red and black stripes were provided by Hummel this season.
On 25 May 2018, the club announced a special edition jersey for the remarkable FAI Cup run. The mainly white shirt featured a red and black diagonal stripe, which had the name of every supporter, who bought the jersey woven into the fabric.

Supplier: Hummel / Sponsor: Mr Green

Management team

Players

Squad statistics

Appearances and goals
. Players in italics have left the club during the season.

{| class="wikitable sortable plainrowheaders" style="text-align:center"
|-
! rowspan="2" |
! rowspan="2" |
! rowspan="2" style="width:75px;" |
! rowspan="2" style="width:180px;" |Name
! colspan="2" style="width:87px;" |Premier Division
! colspan="2" style="width:87px;" |FAI Cup
! colspan="2" style="width:87px;" |EA Sports Cup
! colspan="2" style="width:87px;" |IRN BRU Cup
! colspan="2" style="width:87px;" |Total
|-
!
!Goals
!
!Goals
!
!Goals
!
!Goals
!
!Goals
|-
|1
|GK
|
! scope="row" |Shane Supple

|33
|0

|5
|0

|1
|0

|1
|0

!40
!0
|-
|2
|DF
|
! scope="row" |Derek Pender

|19
|1

|5
|0

|0
|0

|1(1)
|0

!25(1)
!1
|-
|3
|DF
|
! scope="row" |Darragh Leahy

|23(1)
|1

|5
|1

|0
|0

|0
|0

!28(1)
!2
|-
|4
|DF
|
! scope="row" |Dan Casey

|31
|3

|4
|1

|1
|0

|0
|0

!36
!4
|-
|5
|DF
|
! scope="row" |Rob Cornwall

|24(2)
|3

|1(1)
|0

|0
|0

|2
|0

!27(3)
!3
|-
|6
|DF
|
! scope="row" |Daniel Byrne

|12(11)
|1

|1(2)
|0

|2
|0

|2
|0

!17(13)
!1
|-
|-
|7*
|MF
|
! scope="row" |Karl Moore

|7(4)
|0

|0
|0

|0
|0

|0
|0

!7(4)
!0
|-
|8*
|MF
|
! scope="row" |Philip Gannon

|3(5)
|0

|0
|0

|3
|0

|0
|0

!6(5)
!0
|-
|8
|MF
|
! scope="row" |Robbie McCourt

|3
|1

|0
|0

|0
|0

|2
|0

!5
!1
|-
|9
|FW
|
! scope="row" |Daniel Corcoran

|24(7)
|11

|5
|5

|0
|0

|1(1)
|0

!30(8)
!16
|-
|10
|MF
|
! scope="row" |Keith Ward

|25(6)
|2

|5
|1

|1
|0

|0
|0

!31(6)
!3
|-
|11
|MF
|
! scope="row" |Kevin Devaney

|19(7)
|5

|5
|0

|0
|0

|2
|1

!26(7)
!6
|-
|12
|MF
|
! scope="row" |Daniel Grant

|8(12)
|3

|1(2)
|0

|2
|2

|0
|0

!11(14)
!5
|-
|14*
|MF
|
! scope="row" |Patrick Kavanagh

|11(5)
|1

|0
|0

|1
|0

|0
|0

!12(5)
!1
|-
|14
|FW
|
! scope="row" |Ryan Masterson

|0(1)
|0

|0(1)
|0

|0
|0

|0
|0

!0(2)
!0
|-
|15
|MF
|
! scope="row" |Oscar Brennan

|22(3)
|0

|0(1)
|0

|1
|0

|1(1)
|0

!24(5)
!0
|-
|16
|MF
|
! scope="row" |Keith Buckley 

|29
|1

|5
|0

|0
|0

|1(1)
|0

!35(1)
!1
|-
|17
|FW
|
! scope="row" |Cristian Magerusan

|1(3)
|2

|0(1)
|1

|0
|0

|0(1)
|0

!1(5)
!3
|-
|18
|MF
|
! scope="row" |Ian Morris

|22(6)
|1

|4
|1

|0
|0

|0
|0

!26(6)
!2
|-
|19
|MF
|
! scope="row" |JJ Lunney

|17(4)
|2

|5
|1

|3
|1

|1
|0

!26(4)
!4
|-
|21
|MF
|
! scope="row" |Jamie Hamilton

|1(1)
|0

|0
|0

|3
|0

|0
|0

!4(1)
!0
|-
|22*
|MF
|
! scope="row" |John Ross Wilson

|0
|0

|0
|0

|2
|0

|0
|0

!2
!0
|-
|23
|DF
|
! scope="row" |Patrick Kirk

|9(1)
|0

|0(1)
|0

|3
|0

|1(1)
|0

!13(3)
!0
|-
|24
|FW
|
! scope="row" |Ryan Swan

|0
|0

|0
|0

|0
|0

|0
|0

!0
!0
|-
|25
|GK
|
! scope="row" |Colin McCabe

|3
|0

|0
|0

|2
|0

|1
|0

!6
!0
|-
|26*
|MF
|
! scope="row" |Dylan Watts

|16(4)
|1

|0
|0

|2
|2

|0
|0

!18(4)
!3
|-
|26
|MF
|
! scope="row" |Promise Omochere

|0(2)
|0

|0
|0

|0(1)
|0

|0
|0

!0(3)
!0
|-
|27*
|FW
|
! scope="row" |Robert Manley

|1(2)
|0

|0
|0

|3
|1

|0
|0

!4(2)
!1
|-
|27
|MF
|
! scope="row" |Daniel Kelly

|9(1)
|5

|4
|1

|0
|0

|1
|0

!14(1)
!6
|-
|28
|MF
|
! scope="row" |Eoghan Stokes

|18(13)
|5

|0(4)
|2

|2
|1

|2
|0

!22(17)
!8
|-
|29
|DF
|
! scope="row" |Andy Lyons

|4
|0

|0
|0

|1
|0

|1
|0

!6
!0
|-
|30
|GK
|
! scope="row" |Sean Bohan

|0
|0

|0
|0

|0
|0

|0
|0

!0
!0
|-
|31
|FW
|
! scope="row" |Ali Reghba

|1
|2

|0(1)
|0

|0
|0

|1
|0

!2(1)
!2
|-
|32
|FW
|
! scope="row" |Ryan Graydon

|1
|0

|0
|0

|2
|0

|1
|0

!3
!0
|-
|
|FW
|
! scope="row" |Steven Nolan

|0
|0

|0
|0

|0(1)
|0

|0
|0

!0(1)
!0
|-
|
|MF
|
! scope="row" |Luke Nolan

|0
|0

|0
|0

|0(1)
|0

|0
|0

!0(1)
!0
|-
|
|MF
|
! scope="row" |Dylan Thornton

|0
|0

|0
|0

|0(3)
|0

|0
|0

!0(3)
!0
|}

Goalscorers

Competitions

Premier Division

League table

Results summary

Results by matchday

Matches

The fixtures for the 2018 season were announced on 19 December 2017.

FAI Cup

EA Sports Cup

Leinster Senior Cup

Scottish Challenge Cup

Notes

References

Bohemian F.C. seasons
Bohemian F.C.